{{Automatic taxobox
| taxon = Termitinae
| type_species = Inquilinitermes spp.Mathews, 1977
| subdivision_ranks = Species
| subdivision =
Inquilinitermes. microcerus
(Silvestri, 1901)
Inquilinitermes. fur
(Silvestri, 1901)
Inquilinitermes. inquilinus
(Emerson, 1925)
Inquilinitermes. johnchapmani
Scheffrahn, 2014
}}Inquilinitermes spp. (Blattodea: Termitidae: Termitinae) is a genus of Neotropical termites described by Anthony G. Mathews  that includes species found exclusively inside nests of another termite species (i.g. host termites), belonging to the genus Constrictotermes spp. (Blattodea: Termitidae: Nasutitermitinae). For not being able to build their own nest, every species of Inquilinitermes has been commonly referred as an obligatory inquiline and its symbiosis with a host termite has been treated as inquilinism.

In the past few decades, species of the genus have been investigated in various studies, e.g. focusing on their relationship with the host species, their diet requirements  and, more recently, behavioral aspects of their symbiosis with the builder termites

References

See also 
 Mutualism – both species experience a mutual benefit in the relationship.
 Parasitism – one species benefits at the expense of another in the relationship.
 Parabiosis – both species occupy the same dwelling without interdependence.
 Symbiosis – long-term stable relationships between different species.

Termite genera